The 1910–11 season saw Rochdale compete in The F.A. Cup for the 3rd time and reached the fifth qualifying round. The also competed in the Lancashire Combination Division 1 and finished top of the table.

Statistics

|}

Competitions

Lancashire Combination Division 1

F.A. Cup

Lancashire Senior Cup

Friendlies

References

Rochdale A.F.C. seasons
Rochdale